Lynne Me Your Ears – A Tribute to the Music of Jeff Lynne is a compilation of compositions written by songwriter Jeff Lynne. Most tracks on the album are cover versions of Lynne's longest-running and most successful group, Electric Light Orchestra, although there are also cover versions of work that Lynne has done with Traveling Wilburys, The Move and The Idle Race.

Track listing

Disc 1
"10538 Overture" – Bobby Sutliff & Mitch Easter (4:35)
"Ma Ma Ma Belle" – Earl Slick (4:05)
"Telephone Line" – Jeffrey Foskett (4:49)
"Do Ya" – Jason Falkner (3:58)
"Sweet Is the Night" – Ben Lee (3:28)
"Rockaria!" – Pat Buchanan (3:49)
"Every Little Thing" – Michael Carpenter (3:52)
"No Time" – Peter Holsapple (3:59)
"Showdown" – Richard Barone (4:26)
"Handle with Care" – Jamie Hoover (3:25)
"Strange Magic" – Mark Helm (3:54)
"Evil Woman" – Ross Rice (4:51)
"Steppin' Out" – Carl Wayne (4:27)
"Don't Bring Me Down" – Swag (3:13)
"One Summer Dream" – Prairie Sons And Daughters (feat. Prairie Prince) (7:16)
"Can't Get It Out of My Head" – Doug Powell (4:57)

Disc 2
"Twilight" – The Shazam (3:11)
"Mr. Blue Sky" – Tony Visconti (with Kristeen Young and Richard Barone) (5:02)
"You Took My Breath Away" – The Heavy Blinkers (3:07)
"Message from the Country" – The Balls of France (4:28)
"The Minister" – Ferenzik (4:43)
"Xanadu" – Neilson Hubbard And Venus Hum (3:31)
"When Time Stood Still" – Bill Lloyd (3:27)
"Above the Clouds" – Sparkle Jets UK (4:00)
"Rock And Roll Is King" – Walter Clevenger & The Dairy Kings (3:14)
"Morning Sunshine" – Jeremy (2:19)
"Boy Blue" – Rick Altizer (3:45)
"Livin' Thing" – PFR (3:57)
"On the Run" – Sixpence None the Richer (2:37)
"Bluebird Is Dead" – Todd Rundgren (5:06)
"Turn to Stone" – Roger Klug (5:11)
"Eldorado" – Fleming and John (6:41)

References

Jeff Lynne
2001 compilation albums
Tribute albums